Flores is a Spanish surname.

History
In Spain, the surname Flores is first found in the Kingdom of Asturias, where the Visigothic royal court took refuge after the Muslim Invasion of the Iberian Peninsula in 711. In its origin, it is a patronymic of the Visigothic given name Fruela or Froila.

In Italy, the surname's roots can be traced back to the Kingdom of Naples around the early 14th century where records show a Flores family receiving land grants in the feudal territories of Persano and Sandionisio.

Variations
Spelling variations of this surname also include Fruélaz, Fruelaz, Froílaz, Froilaz, Florez, Flórez, Floriz, Flóriz, Floraz, Flóraz, Flor, Florán, Floran and Florián, among others.

Variations can also be found in several Florez coat-of-arms designs. The one similar feature many of these designs have in common is the fleur-de-lis, usually on a blue field, though varying in number from three to five, and possibly used in conjunction with other symbols.

People with the surname
 Alberto Flores Galindo (1949–1990), Peruvian intellectual
 Alexis Flores (born 1975), Honduran fugitive
 Carlos Flores (disambiguation), multiple people
 Chris Flores (disambiguation), multiple people
 Cirilo B. Flores (1948–2014), Roman Catholic bishop of San Diego, U.S.
 Dan Flores (born 1948), historian of the American West
 Daniel Flores (disambiguation), multiple people
 David Flores (disambiguation), multiple people
 Dennis Flores, a Puerto Rican activist.
 Erika Flores (born 1979), American former child actress and former actress, sister of Melissa Flores
 Esteban Flores (born 1970), American Homicide Detective
 Fernando Flores (born 1943), Chilean philosopher
 Ignacio Flores (disambiguation), multiple people
 Isabel Flores de Oliva (1586–1617), Spanish-Peruvian saint
 Jesús Flores (disambiguation), multiple people
 Jorge Flores (disambiguation), multiple people
 José Flores (disambiguation), multiple people
 Leopoldo Ruiz y Flóres (1865–1941), Mexican archbishop, Vatican diplomat
 Manuel N. Flores, fought in Texas Revolution and Republic Era, early Texas rancher
 Patrick Flores (1929–2017), Archbishop of San Antonio from 1979 to 2004, 1st Mexican American to become a Roman Catholic bishop
 Pedro Flores (disambiguation), multiple people
 Ricardo Flores Magón (1874–1922), Mexican anarchist
 Rodrigo Flores
 Salvador Flores, recruited and commanded troops in the Texas Revolution and Republic Era, Juan Seguin's brother-in-law
 Walter Flores (disambiguation), multiple people

Arts

General
 Demián Flores (born 1971), Mexican artist
 Elsa Flores (born 1955), American artist
 Jake Flores, American comedian
 Leopoldo Flores (1934–2016), Mexican artist
 Marco Antonio Flores (1937–2013), Guatemalan writer and poet

Actors
 April Flores (born 1976), American pornographic actress
 Bella Flores (1929–2013), Filipino actress
 Benjamin Flores Jr. (born 2002), American actor and rapper
 Christina Milian (b. Christine Flores), American recording artist, actress, and dancer
 Édgar Flores, Honduran actor
 Freddy Flores, Argentine actor
 Gabriela Flores, Argentine actress
 Jace Flores, Filipino TV actor
 Jorge Flores, Puerto Rican female impersonator, actor, and singer (also known as Nina Flowers)
 Laura Flores, Mexican actress
 Von Flores (born 1960), Filipino-Canadian actor
 Yves Flores (born 1994), Filipino actor and model

Music
 Andrés Flores (composer), Bolivian composer
 Armando Flores, Mexican musician
 Charles Flores (1970–2012), Cuban-born American jazz bassist
 Gerphil Flores (born 1990), Filipino singer
 José Asunción Flores, Paraguayan composer
 Lola Flores, Spanish singer
 Martha Flores (1928–2020), Cuban radio host and singer

Politicians
 Ana María Flores (born 1952), Bolivian engineer, businesswoman and politician
 Brenda Mercedes Flores (born 1969), Honduran politician
 Cilia Flores (born 1953), Venezuelan lawyer and politician
 Consuelo Flores (born 1962), Ecuadorian lawyer and politician
 Emigdio Flores Calpiñeiro (born 1950), Bolivian politician and sociologist
 Francisco Flores Pérez (1959–2016), former president of El Salvador (1999–2004)
 Juan José Flores, first President of Ecuador
 José María Flores, governor of Alta California (now California and Southwestern United States)
 Joseph Flores, Maltese politician
 Laura E. Flores, Panamanian ambassador to the United Nations
 Venancio Flores, President of Uruguay from 1854 to 1855 (interim) and from 1865 to 1868

American politicians
 Alfred Flores (1916–2009), Guamanian politician
 Anitere Flores (born 1976), Florida state senator
 Bill Flores (born 1954), U.S. Representative from Texas
 Gaspar Flores de Abrego (1781–1836), Tejano land commissioner who fought alongside the colonists in Austin and was mayor of San Antonio, Texas
 Irvin Flores (1925–1994), Puerto Rican activist and nationalist politician
 Mayra Flores (born 1986), U.S. Representative from Texas
 Pete Flores (born 1960), Texas state senator

Mexican politicians
 Arturo Flores Grande (born 1965), Mexican politician
 César Flores Maldonado (born 1963), Mexican economist and politician
 Édgar Flores Galván (born 1961), Mexican politician
 Emilio Flores Domínguez (born 1957), Mexican politician
 Enrique Flores Flores (born 1982), Mexican politician
 Felipe Amadeo Flores Espinosa (born 1947), Mexican politician

Sports

General
 Brenda Flores (born 1991), Mexican long-distance runner
 Brian Flores (born 1981), American football coach
 Diego Flores (chess player) (born 1982), Argentine chess grandmaster
 Iker Flores (born 1976), Spanish cyclist
 Jacob Flores, American judoka athlete
 Luis Flores (basketball), Dominican basketball player
 Tom Flores, American football player and coach

Baseball

 Gil Flores (born 1952), Puerto Rican baseball player
 Jesse Flores (baseball), Mexican baseball player
 Randy Flores, former MLB baseball player 
 Wilmer Flores (born 1991), Venezuelan baseball player

Boxing
 Adam Flores (born 1970), Mexican boxer
 Alexander Flores (boxer) (born 1990), American boxer
 Benjamín Flores (1984–2009), Mexican boxer
 BJ Flores (born 1979), American boxer
 Felix Flores (born 1976), Puerto Rican boxer

Football (soccer)
 Ágnel Flores (born 1989), Venezuelan footballer
 Andrés Flores (born 1990), Salvadoran footballer
 Arles Flores (born 1991), Venezuelan footballer
 Charly Flores (born 1997), American soccer player
 Claudio Flores (born 1976), Uruguayan footballer
 Cristian Flores (born 1988), Mexican footballer
 Cristián Flores (born 1972), Chilean footballer
 Darío Flores (born 1984), Uruguayan footballer
 Dennis Flores (born 1993), American soccer player
 Deybi Flores (born 1996), Honduran footballer
 Dylan Flores (born 1993), Costa Rican footballer
 Edison Flores (born 1994), Peruvian footballer
 Eduardo Flores (1944–2022), Argentine footballer
 Efraín Flores (born 1958), Mexican football manager
 Federico Flores (born 1992), Argentine footballer
 Felipe Flores (born 1987), Chilean footballer
 Franco Flores (born 1993), Argentine footballer
 Gilberto Flores (born 1983), Brazilian footballer
 Jordan Flores, English footballer
 Josué Flores (born 1988), Salvadoran footballer
 Marcos Flores (born 1985), Argentine footballer
 Yony Flores (born 1983), Guatemalan footballer
 Zack Flores (born 1982), American-born Bolivian footballer

Fictional characters
 Nina Sabrina Flores, the protagonist of Nina's World
 Elena Castillo Flores, the protagonist of Elena of Avalor
 Zita Flores, a character in Kim Possible
 Cristal Flores, a character in Dynasty
 Gwen Flores, a main character in Bunk'd
 Karen Flores, a character in Get Shorty

See also
 Eduardo Rózsa-Flores (1960–2009), Bolivian actor, and poet
 Rachael Hip-Flores, American actress
 Jérémy Florès, French surfer
 Juan Diego Flórez, Peruvian operatic tenor

References

Spanish-language surnames
Surnames of Honduran origin
Surnames of Salvadoran origin
Surnames of Filipino origin